Mantri Gari Viyyankudu s a 1983 Telugu-language film released directed by Bapu and stars Chiranjeevi in the lead role and Poornima Jayaram, Nirmalamma and Allu Ramalingaiah in important roles.

Plot
Kobbarikayala Subba Rayudu (Allu Ramalingaiah) is a self-made millionaire, who after attaining a high status, forgets the people who helped him initially and spends life counting his successes. A chance meeting several years later between his son, Siva (Subhalekha Sudhakar) and his former friend Ravulapalem Rambhadraiah's (Raavi Kondala Rao) daughter (Tulasi) leads to both of them falling in love. Subba Rao invites his friend and his wife Annapoornamma (Nirmalamma) to his mansion and insults them reminding of their lower status in society. The rest of the movie is about how Annapoornamma- who challenges Subba Rao that he would one day come to her house begging for their help - gets it done with the main lead taken by her son Babji (Chiranjeevi) with help from others.

Cast
Chiranjeevi .... Babji 
Poornima Jayaram ....  Anuradha 
Allu Ramalingaiah ....  Kobbarikayala SubbaRao 
Nirmalamma ....  Annapoornamma 
Nutan Prasad   
Raavi Kondala Rao ....  Ravulapalem Rambhadraiah 
Subhalekha Sudhakar ....  Siva 
Tulasi ....  Suseela
Kaikala Satyanarayana....  Kappala Appa Rao 
Rallapalli   
Srilakshmi
Potti Prasad
 Vijayan ...special appearance

Crew
 Lyrics: Veturi
 Playback Singers: S. P. Balasubrahmanyam, S. Janaki
 Songs Recording: S. P. Ramanathan
 Dialogue Recording: K. D. Sathisan 
 Re-recording: Pandu (Prasad Studios)
 Make-up: Mallikharjuna Rao & Siva
 Costumes: T. Kondala Rao & Krishna
 Hair Stylists: Adavi Subba Rao & Kalavathi
 Stills : Syamala Rao
 Publicity: Lanka Bhaskar
 Press Relations: I. Arjuna Rao
 Dance Directors: Siva-Subramaniam
 Art Director: Bhaskar Raju
 Stunt Director: Vijayan
 Production Manager: K. V. Narasaiah
 Production Controller: M. Rama Rao & D. Yoganand
 Operative Cameraman: Sarath
 Assistant Directors: Ammineni Madhavi Rao & K. Mahesh Raju
 Associate Director: K. V. Rao
 Editor: Anil Malnad
 Cinematography: Lok Singh
 Composer: Ilaiyaraaja
 Screenplay & Dialogues: Mullapudi Venkata Ramana
 Producer: Jaya Krishna
 Director: Bapu

Production Companies
 Production company: Muddu Art Movies
 Cassettes & Gramophone recording & Release: Echo recording Company
 Studios: Prasad Studios & AVM Studios
 Outdoor Units: Srikrishna Outdoor Unit & Sarada Enterprises
 Printing & Processing: Prasad Film Labs
 Special Effects: Prasad Studios
 Film Lab: AVM Studios 
 Press Publicity: L.A. Advertisers
 Poster Printing: National Litho Printers
 Radio Publicity: Sri Prabhakara Advertisers

Soundtrack                                                  
All songs were composed by Maestro Ilaiyaraaja.

Production
The movie was a remake of a Malayalam film. Producer Jaya Krishna, during an interview, stated that he bought the rights for 40,000 INR. While Bapu-Ramana wanted to have K. V. Mahadevan (who was their usual choice) as the composer, producer Jaya Krishna insisted on having Ilaiyaraaja as the composer, since Ilaiyaraaja-Chiranjeevi's first combination, Abhilasha (1983 film) was a major musical and commercial success. Mantri Gari Viyyankudu was the only movie with Ilaiyaraaja-Bapu/Ramana combination. Heroine Poornima Jayaram was the top heroine in Malayalam and was introduced to Telugu movies through this movie. The budget was 22 lakh rupees [2.2 million] and Chiranjeevi's remuneration was 1.5 lakh rupees. Both Ilaiyaraaja and Poornima Jayaram were given 60,000 Rupees. Cinematographer Lok Singh was paid 50,000 INR. The shooting was done mostly in and around Chennai except for a couple of songs [Emani Ne Cheli Paduduno] and one fight, which were shot in Ooty. The shooting was completed in 40 days.

Reception
The movie was both a critical and commercial success and completed 50 days in most of the centers it was released. While the movie was the first foray for Bapu/Ramana combination into pure commercial cinema, it was praised for still having the Bapu/Ramana touch. The movie became a rage among youth, especially the college scenes and the songs endeared the youth of Andhra to the movie. The movie would have done even better had it not released a week after Khaidi, which was breaking all kinds of industry records at that time.

External links

1983 films
Films directed by Bapu
Films scored by Ilaiyaraaja
1980s Telugu-language films